The New Zealand Warriors 2010 season was the New Zealand Warriors 16th first-grade season. The club competed in Australasia's National Rugby League and finished fifth in regular season before being eliminated in the first round of the playoffs. The coach of the team was Ivan Cleary while Simon Mannering was the club's captain. The Warriors won the club championship award for having the best combined results between the first grade team and the under-20s. The Junior Warriors then went on to win the Toyota Cup grand final, the club's first grand final win in sixteen years.

In 2010 Warriors games were broadcast on New Zealand's Sky network averaged 181,200 viewers.

Milestones

13 February – All Stars Match: Manu Vatuvei represents the NRL All Stars in the pre-season All Stars Match.
14 March – Round 1: Four players made their debuts for the club; Brett Seymour, James Maloney, Jeremy Latimore and Sione Lousi. Lousi also made his NRL debut.
20 March – Round 2: Micheal Luck plays in his 100th game for the club.
28 March – Round 3: James Maloney equals the points club scoring record by scoring 28 points in a match. The record was previously shared by Ivan Cleary and Gene Ngamu.
28 March – Round 3: Wade McKinnon played in his 50th game for the club.
4 April – Round 4: Bill Tupou made his debut for the club and his debut in the NRL.
18 April – Round 6: Ian Henderson played in his 50th game for the club.
15 May – Round 10: Mataupu Poching made his debut for the club and his debut in the NRL.
23 May – Round 11: Lance Hohaia played in his 150th game for the club and his 150th NRL match.
6 June – Round 13: Manu Vatuvei played in his 100th match for the club.
17 July – Round 19: Ben Matulino played in his 50th match for the club.
21 August – Round 24: Alehana Mara made his debut for the club and his debut in the NRL.
27 August – Round 25: Sam Rapira played in his 100th match for the club.
10 September – Qualifying Final: Manu Vatuvei became the club's all-time leading try scorer, surpassing Stacey Jones' total of 77. 
10 September – Qualifying Final: Russell Packer played in his 50th match for the club.
4 October – Grand Final: The club was presented with the Club Championship and the Junior Warriors won the Toyota Cup.

Jersey and sponsors

Fixtures 

The Warriors again use Mt Smart Stadium as their home ground in 2010, their only home ground since they entered the competition in 1995.

Pre-season training
The main squad returned to training on 2 November 2009 to start preparing for the 2010 season. Players involved in the 2009 Four Nations and 2009 Pacific Cup returned to training later.

Pre-season matches

Regular season

Finals

Ladder

Squad 

Twenty nine players played for the Warriors during the season. Seven players made their debut for the club, including four making their NRL debuts.

Staff
Chief executive officer: Wayne Scurrah
Football Operations Manager: Don Mann Jr
Recruitment and Development Manager: Dean Bell
High Performance Manager: Craig Walker
High Performance Assistant: Ruben Wiki
Medical Services Manager: Jude Spiers
Welfare and Education Manager: Jerry Seuseu

NRL staff
NRL Head Coach: Ivan Cleary
NRL Assistant Coach: Tony Iro
NRL Technical Assistant: David Fairleigh
NRL Assistant Trainer: Dayne Norton
Club doctor: John Mayhew
Kicking Coach: Daryl Halligan

NYC staff
NYC Head Coach & Assistant NRL Coach: John Ackland
NYC Assistant Coach: Frank Harold
NYC Manager: Jerry Seuseu

Transfers

Gains

Losses

Mid-season losses

Contract extensions
Micheal Luck – until end of 2012.

Other teams
In 2010 the Junior Warriors again competed in the Toyota Cup while senior players who were not required for the first team play with the Auckland Vulcans in the NSW Cup. The Vulcans finished ninth out of twelve teams and missed the finals by just one point. Brent Gemmell was the coach of the Vulcans. Pita Godinet was the Vulcans player of the year while Johnny Aranga won the Rookie of the year award.

2010 Junior Warriors

Grand Final
The match was the club's sixth grand final appearance in sixteen seasons after the 2002 NRL, 1996 and 1997 Reserve Grade, 1997 Under 19's and 1995 Lion Red Cup grand finals. The club led 12–10 at halftime before going on to win 42–28.

Under-20s: Glen Fisiiahi, Omar Slaimankhel, Sosaia Feki, Siuatonga Likiliki, Elijah Niko, Carlos Tuimavave, Shaun Johnson, Neccrom Areaiiti, Henry Chan-Ting, Mark Ioane, Matt Robinson, Elijah Taylor (C), Sebastine Ikahihifo. Bench: Nafe Seluini, Charlie Gubb, Sam Lousi, Daniel Palavi. Coach: John Ackland.

Captain Ben Henry withdrew before the match started due to injury while John Palavi was omitted from the bench. Carlos Tuimavave won the man of the match award.

Awards
Manu Vatuvei was named the Lion Red Player of the Year and the Vodafone One Tribe Player of the Year at the club's annual awards function. James Maloney was the Vodafone Young Player of the Year while Aaron Heremaia was named the Canterbury of New Zealand Clubperson of the Year.

Micheal Luck, Vatuvei and Sam Rapira were all presented with rings to celebrate them playing there 100th match for the club during the season.

References

External links
Warriors official site
Warriors 2010 season rugby league project

New Zealand Warriors seasons
New Zealand Warriors season
War